Furta sacra (Latin, "holy theft") refers to the medieval Christian practice of stealing saints' relics and moving them to a new shrine. Trade in and thefts of relics led to the creation of a new genre of hagiography that aimed to legitimize the actions that brought relics to their new homes; in these writings, the translation of the relics is often portrayed as morally necessary, or even requested directly by God. Sometimes, hagiographers would try to downplay the theft, but in general it was believed that a relic could not be stolen without the permission of the saint; a successful theft thus indicated saintly approval of the action. Saints Marcellinus and Peter are a famous example. Saint Faith is another. A monk from Conques brought her relics to the Abbey Church of Sainte-Foy after spending ten years undercover as a secular priest in Agen, where her relics had previously been housed.

References

Further reading 

 
 

Theft